Dizaj-e Bozorg (also Romanized as Dīzaj-e Bozorg; also known as Dīzaj, Dīzeh, Dīzei, and Dīzej) is a village in Beygom Qaleh Rural District, in the Central District of Naqadeh County, West Azerbaijan Province, Iran. As of the 2006 census, its population was 526, in 104 families.

References 

Populated places in Naqadeh County